The Irish National Final was held on 12 February 1967 by RTÉ TV in Dublin, Ireland.

Before Eurovision

National final
The final was hosted by Brendan O'Reilly at the studios of RTÉ in Dublin. The winner was chosen by postcard voting.

At Eurovision
Ireland started at placement 17th at the end of the start-field and finished 2nd place with 22 points.

Voting

References

Eurovision Song Contest : National Final : Ireland 1967 - ESC-History.com
Irish National Final 1967 - Geocities.com

1967
Countries in the Eurovision Song Contest 1967
Eurovision
Eurovision